Yagaburne is a rural locality in the Goondiwindi Region, Queensland, Australia. In the  Yagaburne had a population of 13 people.

History 
The locality name relates to an early pastoral run. The Yagaburne run appears on an 1883 map of the Darling Downs, believed to be taken up in the 1850s.

In the  Yagaburne had a population of 13 people.

References 

Goondiwindi Region
Localities in Queensland